Fifth Third Field is a Minor League Baseball stadium in Toledo, Ohio. The facility is home to the Toledo Mud Hens, an International League team and the Triple-A affiliate of the Detroit Tigers.

The stadium seats 10,300 and opened in 2002. It hosted the 2006 Triple-A All-Star Game and home run derby. The stadium was named one of the best minor league ballparks in America by Newsweek. In the summer of 2007, ESPN.com rated The Roost section of Fifth Third Field as the best seats to watch a game in minor league baseball.

The Ohio-based Fifth Third Bank purchased the naming rights to the baseball stadium.

Location
It is located in downtown Toledo, two blocks from the Maumee River. The new stadium replaced Ned Skeldon Stadium, located in suburban Maumee, as the Mud Hens' home.  Ned Skeldon Stadium was described as "quaint" or "rustic" and the new park was intended to boost development downtown. A small commercial area has sprung up around the park, centered on St. Clair Street, on the park's southeast side.

The street address is 406 Washington Street. The park is bounded by Washington Street (southwest, first base), North Huron Street (northwest, third base), Monroe Street/Henry Morse Way (northeast, left field) and Msgr. Jerome Schmidt Way/North St. Clair Street (southeast, right field).

The Fifth Third Field is part of a complex that includes the SeaGate Convention Centre and the Huntington Center (formerly known as the Lucas County Arena).  The Lucas County Commissioners teamed with HNTB Architecture Inc., a national sports architecture firm located in Kansas City and local architects and landscape architects The Collaborative Inc, of Toledo to design the Mud Hens Stadium.

Following nearly two years of planning, the Stadium, with assistance from the City of Toledo and Lucas County, embarked upon an entertainment district expansion creating the district known as Hensville. The $21 million expansion is expected to draw 150,000–200,000 more people to Toledo's downtown. The entertainment district stretches along  North St. Clair Street from Washington to Monroe streets, adjacent to the ballpark. The area includes the expanded Swamp Shop, new retail shop Holy Toledo, several rooftop bars, Nine restaurant, Fleetwood's Tap Room, and Hensville Park. In addition to increased traffic for ballgames, the district will also hold events such as outdoor concerts, Monday movie nights, fireworks and other unique weekly events.

Features
 Fixed seats: 8,943
 Picnic seats: 776
 Handicap seats: 86
 Seats in the "Roost": 282
 Club Level seats: 1,200
 Suites: 32

The ballpark's largest crowd occurred on July 29, 2017, when 13,406 fans saw the Hens play the Rochester Red Wings.

Scoreboards
In 2009, the Mud Hens installed new ribbon scoreboards along the first base and third base sides of the ballpark. They are in color and can display a variety of graphics, stats, and the game score. Also, the Mud Hens replaced their Fair Play Scoreboards scoreboard and Barco video board with a Daktronics video board display in left field which is in color and is a complete matrix board that shows the line score of the game. It is also zoned on the top 70% where it shows the current batter, animations, games, and replays. The new Daktronics video board also replaced the Fair Play message board below the old Fair Play scoreboard.

In 2019, the Mud Hens, along with Daktronics installed a brand new 2,500-square-foot LED video display and two new ribbon scoreboards. The main display, like the previous one, can show game score, live video, replays, current batter, graphics, and sponsored messages. Similar to the main display, these scoreboards are capable of showing supplemental information such as the current batter, statistics, game score, graphics, and sponsored messages. Both video displays feature a 15HD pixel layout for high image clarity and contrast.

References

External links

 Fifth Third Field Info
 Virtual tour of Fifth Third Field
 Fifth Third Field views
  ESPN.com's Ten Best Seats in the Minor Leagues
 Fifth Third Field - BallparkReviews.com

Sports venues in Toledo, Ohio
Baseball venues in Ohio
Tourist attractions in Toledo, Ohio
Buildings and structures in Toledo, Ohio
Ice hockey venues in Ohio
Outdoor ice hockey venues in the United States
2002 establishments in Ohio
Sports venues completed in 2002
International League ballparks